Miranda Rose Shearer (born 11 May 1982) is an English author.

Writings
Miranda Shearer has written two books. She wrote the first book My Turn To Cook at the age of 18 for her former boyfriend to take to university. It was re-published under the name Cheap as Chips, Better Than Toast: Easy Recipes for Students.

Her second book was written for her sister. Big Secrets for not so Little Girls is described as "dazed and confused teenagers to twentysomethings, full of non-patronising advice on how to survive as a girl".

Bibliography

References

British non-fiction writers
1982 births
Living people